The Slovenian National Police Force is the national government agency that handles the responsibility of law enforcement of the Republic of Slovenia. It is composed of the eight police directorates in Celje, Koper, Kranj, Ljubljana, Maribor, Murska Sobota, Nova Gorica, and Novo Mesto. Law enforcement in Slovenia is governed by the Slovenian Ministry of Internal Affairs. The police force maintains a number of international partnerships with foreign police forces, including training with the U.S. Federal Bureau of Investigation, and involvement in Albania and Kosovo with the Multinational Advisory Police Element. The Slovenian police force was admitted to Organization for Security and Co-operation in Europe on March 24, 1992.

Organization 
The Slovenian National Police Force operates under the Slovenian Ministry of the Interior at three levels, local, general and regional, and is headquartered in Ljubljana. Slovenia is divided into 8 police directorates which control 111 police stations, all of which come under the jurisdiction of the Director General of the Police. In addition to this regular police force, Slovenia also employs the Specialna Enota Policije, utilised for Counter-Terrorism and other high-risk tasks that are too dangerous or too difficult for regular police units.

Staffing 
The Slovenian Police has suffered from chronic underfunding and under-staffing in recent years, due to the public sector's Intervention Measures Act of 2010/11 and the Fiscal Balance Act of 2012. Consequently, a department-wide emergency hiring-freeze was implemented. With combined retirements and unscheduled quittings of many officers due to low salaries, poor benefits and working conditions, the police force lost over 1,000 officers with no replacements being made between the years 2010 and 2015. The hiring freeze was lifted in early January 2015.

Since January 2015, the Slovenian Police had started an increasing recruiting effort with over 300 new officers being hired throughout 2015 along with new applications for 600 reserve, 156 regular and 150 border-patrol police officers being processed as of February 2016.

Due to deteriorating working conditions, the majority of the operational police force went on limited-strike in mid-November 2015. The strike included officers refusing to issue traffic citations for the majority of all offences and decreased response-times on non-emergency calls. After 6 months, the strike officially ended on June 2, 2016, with both of the police unions and the Slovenian Ministry of Internal Affairs reaching an agreement on raising police salaries and certain benefits. Over 5300 officers are now eligible to receive an average raise of €720 (IAT) to their total annual salaries as well as the new post-academy salary going from €8,280 to €9,060 (IAT).

In January 2021, the Ministry of the Interior, led by Aleš Hojs, disclosed salary information with the specification of names and surnames, workposts, and gross salaries received in December 2020 for all the employees of the Slovenian Police. The event was a response to the start of a police strike and was followed by a massive public outcry. The ministry was reproached for violating the privacy of the employees and the Rules on the protection of police information and for the endangerment of police procedures, public safety, and safety of the affected employees. The Information Commissioner, Mojca Prelesnik, considered that the disclosure had been in line with the GDPR and the Slovenian information privacy law since the information related to public sector employees, so she did not opt to start an inspection. The Prime Minister, Janez Janša, promised to withdraw police employees from the payment system of public sector employees.

Work environment and pay 

Slovenian Police officers have an extremely diverse work week schedules depending on their job assignments which include four-day 10-hour weeks or constant 12-hour, one-day off, 10-hour, one-day off rotations. Patrol officers always work with a partner to ensure maximum officer safety and effective distribution of assets. Other assignments for officers include horse-mounted units, detective specializations, specialized tactics unit and traffic enforcement unit, the majority of these assignments are available after an officer has spent a minimum of two years on patrol.

The starting net salary for police officer recruits during the 18-month academy is just over €6,000. After successful graduation, a police officer is placed into the 26th pay grade with the salary increasing to €9,000 and the rank Police Officer IV. Police officers are eligible for a paygrade advancement every three years, following satisfactory work results. Top-step annual net salary for a police officer with only a high-school education (Police Officer I) is €13,800.

Rank structure and insignia 
Insignias indicating the officer's rank are worn on the shoulder of a shirt or jacket. The insignias for regular officers are dark blue with one or more hexagram golden stars and a light-blue trim all-round. Higher-ranking officers have a golden all-round trim. Command staff insignias are embroidered with a golden Triglav-logo.  The insignias of the deputy director general and the director general also have embroidered golden olive leaves.

Complement and equipment 

As of March 1, 2016, the Slovenian police force employed 6,928 officers, at a ratio of 34.25 officers per 10,000 of the population. It also employed 968 detectives and 87 members of the Slovenian Police Special Unit. Of the force's 2,209 vehicles, there were 1726 police cars (including civilian), 87 response vehicles, 165 all-terrain vehicles and 137 motorbikes. To complement these land vehicles, the Slovenian police utilize 6 boats, as well as 7 helicopters. The police officers in Slovenia were armed with the 7.65 mm Crvena Zastava M-70 handgun, which have been replaced by the Beretta M92 and Beretta 8000. Some units also use SIG Sauer and Glock pistols. Supporting weapons include Heckler & Koch MP5 submachine guns, Heckler & Koch G36 and Zastava M-70 assault rifles.

Vehicles 

The Slovenian Police currently operate over 2,000 police cars which are used for a variety of different roles. These include the Citroën Jumper, Ford Focus, Volkswagen Transporter, Volkswagen Touareg, Škoda Superb and Renault Master transports and police cars. The majority of the patrol cars consist of the new Škoda Octavia which were bought in the years of 2016 and 2017 and replaced outdated Opel Astra and Škoda Octavia.

In recent years, the Slovenian Police have been making an increased effort to replace the outdated car fleet with newer additions. In 2014 the Police ordered 156 Renault Mégane Grandtour police cruisers for the purposes of Schengen Area Border Control, along with 155 VW Golf Variant unmarked police cruisers. In 2015 additional orders have been placed for 14 unmarked VW Golf Variant unmarked police cars, several high-speed Provida VW passat 2,0 TDI police interceptors and 12 new VW Golf Variant marked police cruisers, for the first time featuring newly designed fluorescent-yellow reflective markings to increase visibility at night and poor weather conditions. In 2016 the Police ordered a combined number of 328 new vehicles, ranging from all-terrain 4x4 to specialised patrol unmarked cars, which are set to be chosen and delivered until the end of the year. In 2018 they also got 21 SUVs Seat Ateca.

Firearms 
Beretta 92Beretta 8000SIG Sauer P226Glock 19Heckler & Koch MP5Heckler & Koch G36Zastava M70Heckler & Koch HK416

Helicopters

Motorcycles  
Honda DeauvilleYamaha FJR1300APBMW R1150RT

Patrol boats 

P-66P-88P-89P-111 P-08P-16

References

External links